The following are lists of World War I flying aces. Historically, a flying ace was defined as a military aviator credited with shooting down five or more enemy aircraft during aerial combat. The term was first used by French newspapers, describing Adolphe Pégoud as l'as (the ace), after he downed seven  German aircraft.

Victory standards used in World War I

The notion of an aerial "victory" arose from the first aerial combats, which occurred during the early days of World War I. Unsurprisingly, different air services developed their own definitions of exactly what an aerial victory might be, as well as different methods of assessing and assigning credit for aerial victories.

Conditions affecting accuracy of scores

Ownership of the terrain below had its effect on verifying victory. An enemy aircraft that crashed in enemy held territory obviously could not be verified by the victor's ground troops. Because aerial combat commonly took place over or behind the German lines, German scores are generally considered more accurate because German aces' victories were more easily confirmed on the ground. Additionally, the British handicap of returning home against prevailing wind on the Western Front fattened German scores.

The scores presented in the lists cannot be definitive, but are based on itemized lists that are the best available sources of information. Loss of records by mischance and the passage of time complicates reconstructing the actual count for given aces.

Aces are listed after verifying the date and location of combat, and the foe vanquished, for every victory accredited by an aviator's home air service.

Lists

 List of World War I flying aces from Argentina
 List of World War I aces from Australia
 List of World War I flying aces from Austria
 List of World War I flying aces from Austria-Hungary
 List of World War I aces from Belgium
 List of World War I flying aces from the British Empire
 List of World War I aces from Canada
 List of World War I flying aces from Croatia
 List of World War I Czech flying aces
 List of World War I aces from Ecuador
 List of World War I flying aces from Estonia
 List of World War I aces from Fiji
 List of World War I flying aces from France 
 List of World War I aces from Georgia
 List of World War I flying aces from Germany
 List of World War I aces from Greece
 List of World War I flying aces from Hungary
 List of World War I flying aces from India
 List of World War I aces from Italy
 List of World War I aces from Latvia
 List of World War I aces from Lithuania
 List of World War I aces from New Zealand
 List of World War I aces from Poland
 List of World War I flying aces from Romania
 List of World War I flying aces from the Russian Empire
 List of World War I flying aces from Serbia
 List of World War I Slovakian flying aces
 List of World War I flying aces from Swaziland
 List of World War I aces from Switzerland
 List of World War I flying aces from the United States

See also
 Blue Max
 Sanke card
 List of World War II flying aces

References

Bibliography
 Above Flanders' Fields: A Complete Record of the Belgian Fighter Pilots and Their Units During the Great War, 1914–1918. Walter M. Pieters. Grub Street, 1998. , .
 Above the Lines: The Aces and Fighter Units of the German Air Service, Naval Air Service and Flanders Marine Corps, 1914–1918. Norman Franks, Frank W. Bailey, Russell Guest. Grub Street, 1993. , .
 Above the Trenches: A Complete Record of the Fighter Aces and Units of the British Empire Air Forces 1915–1920. Christopher F. Shores, Norman Franks, Russell Guest. Grub Street, 1990. , .
 Above the War Fronts: The British Two-seater Bomber Pilot and Observer Aces, the British Two-seater Fighter Observer Aces, and the Belgian, Italian, Austro-Hungarian and Russian Fighter Aces, 1914–1918: Volume 4 of Fighting Airmen of WWI Series: Volume 4 of Air Aces of WWI. Norman Franks, Russell Guest, Gregory Alegi. Grub Street, 1997. , .
 British and Empire Aces of World War I. Christopher Shores, Mark Rolfe. Osprey Publishing, 2001. , .
 German Air Forces 1914-18. Graham Sumner. Osprey Publishing, 2005. , 9781841769240.
 Italian Aces of World War 1. Paolo Varriale. Osprey Pub Co, 2009. , 9780764316647.
 Over the Front: A Complete Record of the Fighter Aces and Units of the United States and French Air Services, 1914–1918 Norman L. R. Franks, Frank W. Bailey. Grub Street, 1992. , .
 Pusher Aces of World War 1. Jon Guttman, Harry Dempsey. Osprey Pub Co, 2009. , .

External links

 
List of aces
Flying aces